Naim Ibrahim Attallah  (1 May 1931 – 2 February 2021) was a Palestinian-British businessman and writer. He was the publisher of Quartet Books and the owner of The Women's Press. The Palestinian-born entrepreneur was described by The Guardian in 2000 as a "legendary adorer of beautiful women".

He was born in the British Mandate of Palestine in 1931 to a Christian family. He was the publisher of Quartet Books, which was founded in 1972 by Ken Banerji, John Boothe, William Miller and Brian Thompson, and taken over by Attallah in 1976. Attallah was a backer of the Literary Review and The Oldie. He was also the owner of the London-based The Women's Press, founded in 1977; it was founded by him and Stephanie Dowrick. 

His book of memoirs, Fulfilment and Betrayal: 1975–1995, was published in 2007. According to Jennie Erdal's memoir Ghosting (2005), she was the ghostwriter of some of his books, articles and other writings.

Attallah was appointed Commander of the Order of the British Empire (CBE) in the 2017 New Year Honours for services to literature and the arts.

Attallah died from COVID-19 in 2021.

Books
 Fulfilment and Betrayal: 1975–1995, Quartet Books, 2007, 
 In Touch with his Roots, Quartet Books, 2006, 
 The Boy in England, Quartet Books, 2005, 
 The Old Ladies of Nazareth, London: Quartet Books, 2004, 
 Dialogues, Quartet Books, 2000, 
 Insights, Quartet Books, 1999, 
 In Conversation with Naim Attallah, London: Quartet Books, 1998, 
 A Woman a Week, Quartet Books, 1998, 
 Tara and Claire, Quartet Books, 1997, 
 Asking Questions: An Anthology of Interviews with Naim Attallah (with Charlotte Smith), 1996, 
 A Timeless Passion, Quartet Books, 1995, 
 Speaking for the Oldie, Quartet Books, 1994, 
 More of a Certain Age, Quartet Books, 1994, 
 Of a Certain Age, Quartet Books, 1993, 
 Singular Encounters, Quartet Books, 1992, 
 Women, Quartet Books, 1988,

References

 Interview The Times.

External links
 "Naim Attallah Online".
 

 Sally Weale, "Farewell, my lovelies", The Guardian, 27 November 2000 – profile of Naim Attallah.
 

1931 births
2021 deaths
British book publishers (people)
Palestinian businesspeople
Palestinian emigrants to the United Kingdom
Commanders of the Order of the British Empire
Palestinian Christians
Deaths from the COVID-19 pandemic in England